Joshua Jenkins (born 8 February 1989) is a former professional Australian rules footballer. He last played for the Geelong Football Club in the Australian Football League (AFL). He previously played for the Adelaide Football Club from 2012 to 2019 and was on the Essendon Football Club's list in 2011 without playing a senior game.

Basketball career
As a junior Jenkins mainly played basketball and was a development player with the Townsville Crocodiles in the Australian National Basketball League. He had previously played with the Townsville Heat and Mackay Meteors in the QABL, a second tier league within Australia. As a shooting guard, he attended Townsville State High School and led the team to 7th place at the State titles. In 2007 he toured the United States with the Australian junior team.

AFL career

Essendon (2011)

In 2010 he was invited to attend a training camp for the Australian rules football expansion team, after switching away from basketball to play football in Lake Boga, Victoria.

Jenkins spent the 2011 season playing for Essendon's VFL affiliate, the Bendigo Bombers, but was highly sought after in the 2011 trading period. Despite initially seeking a trade to another Victorian club, Jenkins was traded to Adelaide along with national draft pick 41, in exchange for pick 31.

Adelaide (2012–2019) 

Jenkins made his AFL debut in round 7, 2012, against  at AAMI Stadium, and kicked a goal with his first kick. He played 11 matches in his first year and kicked 11 goals. In 2013 Jenkins switched his guernsey number from number 20 to 4, vacated by Kurt Tippett after his controversial departure from the club, and was dubbed as Tippett's replacement in the key forward position. Provided extra responsibility by Tippett's loss and Taylor Walker's injury, Jenkins kicked 24 goals in 17 games in 2013 before a fractured ankle ended his season. He finished third in the club's goalkicking that year.

Jenkins signed a new two-year contract with Adelaide in May 2014. He proceeded to have his best season to date, kicking 40 goals in 20 games, including five against  in round 17. He improved even further in 2015, kicking 46 goals and taking more contested marks than any other Adelaide player.

In round 7, 2016, Jenkins kicked a career-high eight goals in the Crows' 15-point loss to the Western Bulldogs at Etihad Stadium. He went on to kick 62 goals in the season, a career high, and was named in the All-Australian squad of 40. It was reported during the season that rival club  had offered Jenkins a five-year deal worth $750,000 per season; however, he ultimately rejected other offers to sign a five-year contract extension with Adelaide in July.

In round 2, 2017, Jenkins suffered bruised ribs after a collision with Hawthorn player Teia Miles only 10 minutes into the game. He was unable to play the rest of the game, and though he was expected to return the next week, he was eventually ruled out due to his injury being more serious than originally thought. He returned to the side after his injury, but in round 9 he was dropped to the SANFL due to poor form. He returned to the senior side immediately in round 10 against , and kicked three goals. His form improved and he continued to add more facets to his game, managing 12 tackles in a hard-fought contest against  in Round 15. At the end of the season he played in the 2017 AFL Grand Final as part of the Crows' losing team.

Geelong (2020–2021) 

Jenkins retired at the end of the 2021 AFL season after only managing to play two games in two years at Geelong.

Statistics
 Statistics are correct to end of the 2020 season

|- style="background:#eaeaea;"
! scope="row" style="text-align:center" | 2012
| style="text-align:center" | 
| 20 || 11 || 11 || 3 || 74 || 43 || 117 || 50 || 24 || 61 || 1.0 || 0.3 || 6.7 || 3.9 || 10.6 || 4.5 || 2.2 || 5.5 || 0
|- 
! scope="row" style="text-align:center" | 2013
| style="text-align:center" | 
| 4 || 17 || 24 || 24 || 142 || 59 || 201 || 78 || 29 || 61 || 1.4 || 1.4 || 8.4 || 3.5 || 11.8 || 4.6 || 1.7 || 3.6 || 0
|- style="background:#eaeaea;"
! scope="row" style="text-align:center" | 2014
| style="text-align:center" | 
| 4 || 20 || 40 || 26 || 170 || 64 || 234 || 86 || 27 || 55 || 2.0 || 1.3 || 8.5 || 3.2 || 11.7 || 4.3 || 1.4 || 2.8 || 3
|- 
! scope="row" style="text-align:center" | 2015
| style="text-align:center" | 
| 4 || 21 || 46 || 21 || 173 || 68 || 241 || 108 || 28 || 79 || 2.2 || 1.0 || 8.2 || 3.2 || 11.5 || 5.1 || 1.3 || 3.8 || 3
|- style="background:#eaeaea;"
! scope="row" style="text-align:center" | 2016
| style="text-align:center" | 
| 4 || 24 || 62 || 29 || 195 || 95 || 290 || 122 || 46 || 135 || 2.6 || 1.2 || 8.1 || 4.0 || 12.1 || 5.1 || 1.9 || 5.6 || 8
|- 
! scope="row" style="text-align:center" | 2017
| style="text-align:center" | 
| 4 || 21 || 45 || 22 || 189 || 88 || 277 || 110 || 52 || 109 || 2.1 || 1.1 || 9.0 || 4.2 || 13.2 || 5.2 || 2.5 || 5.2 || 2
|- style="background:#eaeaea;"
! scope="row" style="text-align:center" | 2018
| style="text-align:center" | 
| 4 || 22 || 46 || 27 || 200 || 83 || 283 || 111 || 61 || 97 || 2.1 || 1.2 || 9.1 || 3.8 || 12.9 || 5.0 || 2.8 || 4.4 || 3
|- 
! scope="row" style="text-align:center" | 2019
| style="text-align:center" | 
| 4 || 11 || 22 || 17 || 100 || 36 || 136 || 56 || 18 || 68 || 2.0 || 1.5 || 9.1 || 3.3 || 12.4 || 5.1 || 1.6 || 6.2 || 0
|- style="background:#eaeaea;"
! scope="row" style="text-align:center" | 2020
| style="text-align:center" | 
| 11 || 1 || 0 || 0 || 8 || 6 || 14 || 3 || 4 || 7 || 0.0 || 0.0 || 8.0 || 6.0 || 14.0 || 3.0 || 4.0 || 7.0 || 0
|- class="sortbottom"
! colspan=3| Career
! 148
! 296
! 169
! 1251
! 542
! 1793
! 724
! 289
! 672
! 2.0
! 1.1
! 8.5
! 3.7
! 12.1
! 4.9
! 2.0
! 4.5
! 19
|}

Notes

References

External links

1989 births
Living people
Adelaide Football Club players
Australian rules footballers from Victoria (Australia)
Sturt Football Club players
Bendigo Football Club players